Felson is the surname of:

 Nancy Felson, American classical scholar
 Richard Felson (born 1950), American sociologist
 "Fast Eddie" Felson, protagonist of the film The Hustler and its sequel, The Color of Money, played by Paul Newman

See also
 Felsen, another surname